Qarah Sangi (also Romanized as Qarah Sangī and Qareh Sangī; also known as Qal‘eh Sangī) is a village in Pol Khatun Rural District, Marzdaran District, Sarakhs County, Razavi Khorasan Province, Iran. At the 2006 census, its population was 713, in 134 families.

This village is located 95 km south of Sarakhs city and at the confluence of Hari River and Kashf river in the Iran–Turkmenistan border. Its altitude is 400 meters above sea level and its climate is hot and dry mountainous.

References 

Populated places in Sarakhs County